This is a list of events taking place in 2021 relating to Telugu-language television of India.

Television programmes

Shows debuting

Shows returning

Shows ending

Changes of network affiliation

Continuing television programmes

1990s

2000s

2010s

2020s

References 

2021 in Indian television